Shivwits is an unincorporated community in west-central Washington County, Utah, United States. It is occupied by the Shivwits Band of Paiutes.

Description
The community is located along the Santa Clara River and the former routing of U.S. Route 91 within the Shivwits Reservation, northeast of the Beaver Dam Mountains and southwest of the Red Mountains.

See also

References

External links

Unincorporated communities in Washington County, Utah
Unincorporated communities in Utah